Flight Simulator II is a video game written by Bruce Artwick and published by Sublogic as the sequel to FS1 Flight Simulator. It was released in December 1983 for the Apple II, in 1984 for Atari 8-bit and Commodore 64, in 1986 for the Amiga and Atari ST, the Atari XEGS as a pack-in title in 1987 and in August 1988 for the Color Computer 3.

Development

After the release of Flight Simulator for the IBM PC, Sublogic  backported its improvements to other computers as Flight Simulator II. This version, like the Microsoft release, does away with wireframe graphics for solid colors, and uses real-world scenery (although limited to a few areas in the United States). It includes the ability to load additional scenery from floppy disks.

Reception
InfoWorld in 1984 praised Flight Simulator II for the Apple as "a complicated but exhilarating game ... Bruce Artwick has really done it all", and stated that it was superior to Microsoft's version.

Roy Wagner reviewed and compared Solo Flight and Flight Simulator II for Computer Gaming World, and stated that "This program is outstanding and certainly one of the best examples of excellent programming, documentation, and a full use of the capabilities of a microcomputer."

II Computing listed it ninth on the magazine's list of top Apple II games as of late 1985, based on sales and market-share data, and it was Sublogic's best-selling Commodore game as of late 1987.

In 1996, Computer Gaming World declared Flight Simulator II the 79th-best computer game ever released.

References

External links
Flight Simulator II at MobyGames
Review in Softalk
Review in ANALOG Computing
Review in Compute!'s Gazette
Review in The Rainbow
Review in Info
Review in Page 6
Review in Page 6
Review in Page 6
Review in GAMES Magazine

1983 video games
Amiga games
Apple II games
Atari 8-bit family games
Atari ST games
Commodore 64 games
Flight simulation video games
General flight simulators
NEC PC-9801 games
TRS-80 Color Computer games
Video game sequels
Video games developed in the United States